Kanchanaburi railway station is a main railway station of province of Kanchanaburi located in Ban Tai Subdistrict, Kanchanaburi City, Thailand. The line opened in 1942 by the Imperial Japanese Army, during the Second World War. After the war, the State Railway of Thailand bought the line from the Allied powers, and the station reopened in June 24, 1949, from Nong Pladuk Junction.

Train services 
 Ordinary 257/258 Thon Buri–Nam Tok–Thon Buri
 Ordinary 259/260 Thon Buri–Nam Tok–Thon Buri
 Local 485/486 Nong Pladuk–Nam Tok–Nong Pladuk
A special excursion train 909/910 Bangkok–Nam Tok–Bangkok that originates from Bangkok railway station (Hua Lamphong) every Saturday–Sunday and public holidays through this station as well.

References 

 
 

Railway stations in Thailand
Railway stations opened in 1942
1942 establishments in Thailand
Kanchanaburi